Aimable Denhez (10 September 1914 – 30 October 1977) was a French racing cyclist. He rode in the 1935 Tour de France.

References

External links
 

1914 births
1977 deaths
French male cyclists
Place of birth missing